Arthur I. Segel is an American economist, currently the Poorvu Family Professor of Management Practice at Harvard Business School and an Elected Fellow of the American Academy of Arts & Sciences.

References

Year of birth missing (living people)
Living people
Harvard Business School faculty
American economists
Harvard University alumni
Stanford University alumni
Urban Institute people